Northgate High School (NGHS) is a public high school located in northeastern Coweta County near Newnan, Georgia, United States. Founded in 1996, Northgate is the newest of the three Coweta County School System high schools.

Northgate offers four diploma choices: College Prep with Distinction, College Prep, Career/Technical with Distinction, and Career/Technical.  Students may also choose a dual diploma program with both college prep and career/tech seals.

Feeder schools include Lee Middle School, Madras Middle School and Arnall Middle School.  Madras also feeds into the nearby Newnan High School.

Athletics 
Northgate has achieved a few state champions in classes AAAA and AAAAA. In 2009, the school's baseball team compiled a 32-5 record and an all-region championship game with Starr's Mill, and defeated them in three games.

Their competition cheerleading won state in 2007, 2008, 2009, 2010, 2011, 2015, 2016 and 2017. Competition cheerleading finished runner-up in 2006 and 2012. They finished third in 2005.

The girls' soccer team won the AAAAA title in 2013 by defeating conference rival Whitewater. In 2014, they appeared again in the Final Four. In 2015, they were region champions and advanced to the state championship game where they were 5A state runner-up, losing to Starr's Mill.

The boys' soccer team finished 5A state runner-up in 2016, producing a county-best 19-2-1 record and scoring 98 goals along the way.

Northgate's softball team won their first championship in 2007 and won again in 2011.

The first state championship in school history was earned by the wrestling squad in 2002. Tyler Askey won his fourth state wrestling championship in 2013, with a perfect record of 194-0.

Band program 
In 20 years as a competitive unit, the band has earned 112 Class Championship awards, 39 Divisional Championship awards and 9 Grand Championship awards. The band has also performed in several notable events, including the Children's Healthcare of Atlanta Christmas Parade, the New York City St. Patrick's Day parade, the Hollywood Christmas Parade, the Hollywood Bowl, and the National Cherry Blossom Parade.

Notable alumni 
 Natalie Bryant, married musician and 1990s boy band member of Hanson, Taylor Hanson
 Brandon Facyson, professional National Football League cornerback for the Las Vegas Raiders
 Wil Lutz, professional National Football League kicker for the New Orleans Saints
 Will Smith, professional Major League Baseball pitcher for the Atlanta Braves
 Kathryn Tucker, married musician and 1990s boy band member of Hanson, Zac Hanson

References 

Public high schools in Georgia (U.S. state)
Schools in Coweta County, Georgia
1996 establishments in Georgia (U.S. state)
Educational institutions established in 1996